

Major ideas 

 Urban area
 City
 Metropolitan area
 Suburb
 Land use
 Planning
 Planning and zoning commission
 Growth management

Branches of planning

Physical and real estate 

 Land-use planning
 Neighborhood planning
 Comprehensive planning (US)
 Spatial planning
 Urban design
 Redevelopment
 Regional planning
 Mixed-use development

Community and economic development 
 Community economic development
 Community development planning

Environment 

 Environmental planning
 Recreation resource planning
 Sustainable development
 Climate change adaptation
 Conservation development
 Low-impact development

Transportation 

 Transportation planning
 Transit-oriented development
 Public transport planning

Preservation 

 Historic preservation

 Preservation development

Research 

 Urbanism

Urban informatics

Other approaches 

 Indigenous planning
 Online land planning
 Participatory planning
 Participatory GIS
 Technical aspects of urban planning
 Community engagement
 Participatory development
 People-centered development

History and theory of planning 
Theories of urban planning and history of urban planning

 Sanitary movement
 Garden city movement
 Back-to-the-land movement
 Linear city
 City Beautiful movement
 Soviet urban planning ideologies of the 1920s
 Towers in the park
 New towns movement
 Strategic urban planning
 Advocacy planning
 New Suburbanism
 Communicative planning
 Rational planning model

Planning by region 

 Planning cultures

Planning of Africa 

 Urban planning in Africa
 Urbanization in Africa
 Urban planning in ancient Egypt

Planning of Asia 

 Urban planning in China
 Urban planning in Shanghai
 Ancient Chinese urban planning

 Urban planning in Singapore
 Urban planning in Iran

Planning of Europe 

 Town and country planning in the United Kingdom
 Spatial planning in England
 Town and country planning in Wales
 Spatial planning in Serbia
 Urban planning in Spain
 Urban planning of Barcelona
 Urban planning in the Czech Republic
 Urban planning in Nazi Germany
 Urban planning in communist countries
 Soviet urban planning ideologies of the 1920s

Planning of North America 

 Urban planning in the United States
 Planning and development in Detroit

Planning of Oceania 

 Urban planning in Australia
 Urban planning in Sydney

Planning of South America

Planning education 

 Urban planning education

Awards for planning 

 Danish Urban Planning Award
 Kevin Lynch Award

Related fields 

 Architecture
 Civil engineering
 Development economics
 Urban ecology
 Urban economics
 Geography
 Land development
 Landscape architecture
 Marine spatial planning
 Public health
 Public policy
 Real estate development
 Social sciences

See also 

 Terminology
 Outline of transport planning
 Outline of architecture
 Outline of geography

Urban planning
Outlines of geography and places
Wikipedia outlines